WZET (92.1 FM), branded on-air as Mix 107, is a radio station licensed to Hormigueros, Puerto Rico, the station serves the Western Puerto Rico area.  The station is currently owned by International Broadcasting Corporation.

WZET broadcasts in the HD Radio format, and carries additional programming on three of the station's HD subchannels. In addition, WZET-HD2's programming is simulcast on translator station W295BU 106.9 FM in Mayagüez.

References

External links
 

 

ZET
Radio stations established in 1980
1980 establishments in Puerto Rico
Hormigueros, Puerto Rico
Urban adult contemporary radio stations